Puntius waageni is a species of ray-finned fish in the genus Puntius. This species is endemic to Pakistan.

The fish is named in honor of the geologist and paleontologist Wilhelm Heinrich Waagen (1841-1900), who collected the type specimen.

References 

Waageni
Freshwater fish of Pakistan
Endemic fauna of Pakistan
Taxa named by Francis Day
Fish described in 1872